R.S.C. Anderlecht won the title of the 1992–93 season.

Relegated teams

These teams were relegated to the second division at the end of the season:
KSC Lokeren
Boom FC

Final league table

Results

Top goal scorers

References

Belgian Pro League seasons
Belgian
1992–93 in Belgian football